Rachis sanguineus is an extinct species of air-breathing land snail, a terrestrial pulmonate gastropod mollusk in the superfamily Enoidea. This species was endemic to Mauritius.

References

sanguineus
Extinct gastropods
Extinct animals of Africa
Fauna of Mauritius
Molluscs of Africa
Extinct animals of Mauritius
Taxonomy articles created by Polbot